Arthur Riggs is the name of:
Arthur Riggs (geneticist) (1939−2022), geneticist who worked with Genentech to express the first artificial gene in bacteria
Arthur Stanley Riggs (1879−1952), American writer, editor and historian